The Ancient Romans developed the Roman hand abacus, a portable, but less capable, base-10 version of earlier abacuses like those that were used by the Greeks and Babylonians.

Origin
The Roman abacus was the first portable calculating device for engineers, merchants, and presumably tax collectors. It greatly reduced the time needed to perform the basic operations of arithmetic using Roman numerals.

Karl Menninger said: 
For more extensive and complicated calculations, such as those involved in Roman land surveys, there was, in addition to the hand abacus, a true reckoning board with unattached counters or pebbles. The Etruscan cameo and the Greek predecessors, such as the Salamis Tablet and the Darius Vase, give us a good idea of what it must have been like, although no actual specimens of the true Roman counting board are known to be extant. But language, the most reliable and conservative guardian of a past culture, has come to our rescue once more. Above all, it has preserved the fact of the unattached counters so faithfully that we can discern this more clearly than if we possessed an actual counting board. What the Greeks called psephoi, the Romans called calculi. The Latin word calx means 'pebble' or 'gravel stone'; calculi are thus little stones (used as counters).

Both the Roman abacus and the Chinese suanpan have been used since ancient times. With one bead above and four below the bar, the systematic configuration of the Roman abacus is comparable to the modern Japanese soroban, although the soroban was historically derived from the suanpan.

Layout

The Late Roman hand abacus shown here as a reconstruction contains seven longer and seven shorter grooves used for whole number counting, the former having up to four beads in each, and the latter having just one. The rightmost two grooves were for fractional counting. The abacus was made of a metal plate where the beads ran in slots. The size was such that it could fit in a modern shirt pocket.

| |    | |    | |    | |    | |    | |    | |    | |
| |    | |    | |    | |    | |    | |    | |    | |
|O|    |O|    |O|    |O|    |O|    |O|    |O|    |O|

|X|  CCC|ƆƆƆ CC|ƆƆ   C|Ɔ     C      X      I      Ө     | |
---    ---    ---    ---    ---    ---    ---    ---  S |O|
| |    | |    | |    | |    | |    | |    | |    | |
| |    | |    | |    | |    | |    | |    | |    | |    | |
|O|    |O|    |O|    |O|    |O|    |O|    |O|    |O|  Ɔ |O|
|O|    |O|    |O|    |O|    |O|    |O|    |O|    |O|   
|O|    |O|    |O|    |O|    |O|    |O|    |O|    |O|    | |
|O|    |O|    |O|    |O|    |O|    |O|    |O|    |O|  2 |O|
                                                 |O|    |O|

The lower groove marked I indicates units, X tens, and so on up to millions. The beads in the upper shorter grooves denote fives—five units, five tens, etc., essentially in a bi-quinary coded decimal place value system.

Computations are made by means of beads which, we believe, would have been slid up and down the grooves to indicate the value of each column.

The upper slots contained a single bead while the lower slots contained four beads, the only exceptions being the two rightmost columns, column 2 marked Ө and column 1 with three symbols down the side of a single slot or beside three separate slots with Ɛ, 3 or S or a symbol like the £ sign but without the horizontal bar beside the top slot, a backwards C beside the middle slot and a 2 symbol beside the bottom slot, depending on the example abacus and the source which could be Friedlein, Menninger or Ifrah. These latter two slots are for mixed-base math, a development unique to the Roman hand abacus described in following sections.

The longer slot with five beads below the Ө position allowed for the counting of 1/12 of a whole unit called an uncia (from which the English words inch and ounce are derived), making the abacus useful for Roman measures and Roman currency. The first column was either a single slot with 4 beads or 3 slots with one, one and two beads respectively top to bottom. In either case, three symbols were included beside the single slot version or one symbol per slot for the three slot version. Many measures were aggregated by twelfths.  Thus the Roman pound ('libra'), consisted of 12 ounces (unciae) (1 uncia = 28 grams).  A measure of volume, congius, consisted of 12 heminae (1 hemina = 0.273 litres). The Roman foot (pes), was 12 inches (unciae) (1 uncia = 2.43 cm).  The actus, the standard furrow length when plowing, was 120 pedes. There were however other measures in common use - for example the sextarius was two heminae.

The as, the principal copper coin in Roman currency, was also divided into 12 unciae.  Again, the abacus was ideally suited for counting currency.

Symbols and usage 

The first column was arranged either as a single slot with three different symbols or as three separate slots with one, one and two beads or counters respectively and a distinct symbol for each slot. It is most likely that the rightmost slot or slots were used to enumerate fractions of an uncia and these were, from top to bottom, 1/2 s, 1/4 s and 1/12 s of an uncia. The upper character in this slot (or the top slot where the rightmost column is three separate slots) is the character most closely resembling that used to denote a semuncia or 1/24. The name semuncia denotes 1/2 of an uncia or 1/24 of the base unit, the As. Likewise, the next character is that used to indicate a sicilicus or 1/48 of an As, which is 1/4 of an uncia. These two characters are to be found in the table of Roman fractions on page 75 of Graham Flegg's book. Finally, the last or lower character is most similar but not identical to the character in Flegg's table to denote 1/144 of an As, the dimidio sextula, which is the same as 1/12 of an uncia.

This is however even more strongly supported by Gottfried Friedlein in the table at the end of the book which summarizes the use of a very extensive set of alternative formats for different values including that of fractions. In the entry in this table numbered 14 referring back to (Zu) 48, he lists different symbols for the semuncia (1/24), the sicilicus (1/48), the sextula (1/72), the dimidia sextula (1/144), and the scriptulum (1/288). Of prime importance, he specifically notes the formats of the semuncia, sicilicus and sextula as used on the Roman bronze abacus, "auf dem chernan abacus". The semuncia is the symbol resembling a capital "S", but he also includes the symbol that resembles a numeral three with horizontal line at the top, the whole rotated 180 degrees. It is these two symbols that appear on samples of abacus in different museums. The symbol for the sicilicus is that found on the abacus and resembles a large right single quotation mark spanning the entire line height.

The most important symbol is that for the sextula, which resembles very closely a cursive digit 2. Now, as stated by Friedlein, this symbol indicates the value of 1/72 of an As. However, he stated specifically in the penultimate sentence of section 32 on page 23, the two beads in the bottom slot each have a value of 1/72. This would allow this slot to represent only 1/72 (i.e. 1/6 × 1/12 with one bead) or 1/36 (i.e. 2/6 × 1/12 = 1/3 × 1/12 with two beads) of an uncia respectively. This contradicts all existing documents that state this lower slot was used to count thirds of an uncia (i.e. 1/3 and 2/3 × 1/12 of an As.

This results in two opposing interpretations of this slot, that of Friedlein and that of many other experts such as Ifrah, and Menninger who propose the one and two thirds usage.

There is however a third possibility.

If this symbol refers to the total value of the slot (i.e. 1/72 of an as), then each of the two counters can only have a value of half this or 1/144 of an as or 1/12 of an uncia. This then suggests that these two counters did in fact count twelfths of an uncia and not thirds of an uncia. Likewise, for the top and upper middle, the symbols for the semuncia and sicilicus could also indicate the value of the slot itself and since there is only one bead in each, would be the value of the bead also. This would allow the symbols for all three of these slots to represent the slot value without involving any contradictions.

A further argument which suggests the lower slot represents twelfths rather than thirds of an uncia is best described by the figure above. The diagram above assumes for ease that one is using fractions of an uncia as a unit value equal to one. If the beads in the lower slot of column I represent thirds, then the beads in the three slots for fractions of 1/12 of an uncia cannot show all values from 1/12 of an uncia to 11/12 of an uncia. In particular, it would not be possible to represent 1/12, 2/12 and 5/12. Furthermore, this arrangement would allow for seemingly unnecessary values of 13/12, 14/12 and 17/12. Even more significant, it is logically impossible for there to be a rational progression of arrangements of the beads in step with unit increasing values of twelfths. Likewise, if each of the beads in the lower slot is assumed to have a value of 1/6 of an uncia, there is again an irregular series of values available to the user, no possible value of 1/12 and an extraneous value of 13/12. It is only by employing a value of 1/12 for each of the beads in the lower slot that all values of twelfths from 1/12 to 11/12 can be represented and in a logical ternary, binary, binary progression for the slots from bottom to top. This can be best appreciated by reference to the figure below.
Alternative usages of the beads in the lower slot

It can be argued that the beads in this first column could have been used as originally believed and widely stated, i.e. as ½, ¼ and ⅓ and ⅔, completely independently of each other. However this is more difficult to support in the case where this first column is a single slot with the three inscribed symbols. To complete the known possibilities, in one example found by this author, the first and second columns were transposed. It would not be unremarkable if the makers of these instruments produced output with minor differences, since the vast number of variations in modern calculators provide a compelling example.

What can be deduced from these Roman abacuses, is the undeniable proof that Romans were using a device that exhibited a decimal, place-value system, and the inferred knowledge of a zero value as represented by a column with no beads in a counted position. Furthermore, the biquinary nature of the integer portion allowed for direct transcription from and to the written Roman numerals. No matter what the true usage was, what cannot be denied by the very format of the abacus is that if not yet proven, these instruments provide very strong arguments in favour of far greater facility with practical mathematics known and practised by the Romans in this authors view.

The reconstruction of a Roman hand abacus in the Cabinet, supports this. The replica Roman hand abacus at, shown alone here, plus the description of an Roman abacus on page 23 of  provides further evidence of such devices.

References

Further reading
 
 

Abacus
Ancient Roman technology
Roman mathematics